Grains of Selim are the seeds of a shrubby tree, Xylopia aethiopica, found in Africa. The seeds have a musky flavor and are used as a spice in a manner similar to black pepper, and as a flavouring agent that defines , the dominant style of coffee in Senegal. It is also known as Senegal pepper, Ethiopian pepper, and (historically) Moor pepper and Negro pepper. It is called 'Etso' in the Ewe language of Ghana and Togo. It is sometimes referred to as African pepper or Guinea pepper, but these are ambiguous terms that may refer to Ashanti pepper and grains of paradise, among others.

Description 

As a spice, the whole fruit (pod) is used, as the hull of the fruit lends an aromatic note (with the taste being described as an admixture of cubeb pepper and nutmeg with overtones of resin) whilst the seeds lend pungency (they are also quite bitter). Typically the dried fruit is lightly crushed before being tied in a bouquet garni and added to West African soups (stews). These, however, tend to be the larger pods of the related species Xylopia striata.

Use in regional cuisines
The pods are crushed and added whole to soups or stews, then removed before serving the food. Paste from smoked and ground pods can be used as a spice rub for fish.

In African cookbooks, especially those from Cameroon, the spice is referred to by the name  -  a word of unknown etymology. In northern Cameroon as well as Northern Nigeria, it is one of three spices added to tea, along with dried ginger and cloves.

The Ga use it in preparing , a black, spicy pepper sauce. It is also used in soups and beverages, for example  , a beverage of the Ga. The Ewes use it in soups, porridges and beverages including bisap. It is also sometimes used in soups and stews. Other regional names include kimba and kili.

In Senegal, The grains are a key ingredient in Touba-style coffee (called  in French). Roasting continues for approximately five more minutes; during this time the sneeze-producing scent of pepper becomes easily discernible.

See also
List of culinary herbs and spices

References

 Davidson, Alan; The Oxford Companion to Food, Oxford University Press. 
 Katzer, Gernot; "Xylopia aethiopica", Spice Pages (accessed December 4, 2012)
 "Senegal Pepper", Spice Guide, CeltNet (accessed July 19, 2007)

African cuisine
Spices
Peppers